The MAN SL202 was a single-decker bus manufactured by MAN in Salzgitter, Germany between 1983 and 1993. It was also available as a chassis for external bodywork.

History
The MAN SL202 succeeded the MAN SL200 in 1983.

The SL202 came with a wide choice of transmissions, from three and four-speed Renk Doromat automatic transmissions, to three and four-speed Voith DIWA transmissions, to four and five-speed ZF Ecomat 4HP500 or 5HP500 transmissions. One to date has been retro-fitted with an Allison World Series B300R4 transmission, creating a largely noticeable increase in performance against similar examples with the three-speed Voith DIWA transmission.

The internal combustion engines used in the SL202 were replaced around 1990, from older, smaller, 2566 series engines to newer, larger, 2866 series engines. This same engine was used for the SL200 and is similar in design to that of the OM407h engine used in the Mercedes-Benz O305.

Post-1990 SL202s have the D2866 engine, with higher power and torque figures.

Much of the design was used in the North American version of the SL202, the MAN Americana SL40-102. The SL202 was superseded by the MAN NL202.

Operators
The MAN SL202 was mainly sold in Germany. The chassis version was sold in Australia and New Zealand.

Australia
Sydney Buses purchased 50 Pressed Metal Corporation bodied SL202s in 1989 which were retired in 2013, while the State Transport Authority, Adelaide took delivery of 125 Pressed Metal Corporation Australia bodied examples between 1992 and 1996. The Brisbane City Council purchased two while Darwinbus purchased five.

New Zealand
The Auckland Regional Council purchased 69 SL202s, Christchurch Transport Board 57, New Plymouth City Transit six and Wellington City Council 30. New Zealand Coach Service purchased 11 SL202s between 1986 and 1988.

References

External links

 
SL202
Buses of Germany
Bus chassis
Single-deck buses
Vehicles introduced in 1984